Anniyan is a 2005 Indian Tamil-language psychological action thriller film written and directed by Shankar and produced by V. Ravichandran of Aascar Films. The plot centres on a disillusioned everyman whose frustration at what he sees as increasing social apathy and public negligence leads to a split personality that attempts to improve the system. Vikram stars as Ambi, an idealistic, law-abiding lawyer who has Dissociative identity disorder (formerly known as Multiple personality disorder) and develops two other identities: a suave fashion model named Remo and a murderous vigilante named Anniyan. Sadha plays the female lead role. Actors Vivek, Nedumudi Venu, Nassar and Prakash Raj also featured in the film.

Shankar conceived the film in mid-2003 during the post-production period of his previous film, Boys. He based the film on his own life experiences during his formative years when he was disturbed by what he saw around him, and his eventual displeasure with the society. Pre-production for Anniyan began in November 2003 and principal photography in March 2004. The making of the film, which included numerous production delays, took 14 months. The film was shot at Hyderabad, Thanjavur, Tindivanam and Chennai, and the song sequences were filmed in Mumbai, Malaysia, Amsterdam and Tenkasi. The film was notable for its recreation of the Tyagaraja Aradhana music festival and the extensive use of time slice photography in an action sequence.

Cinematographer V. Manikandan abandoned the project halfway through, until he was replaced with Ravi Varman. The technical departments were headed by V. T. Vijayan (editing), Sabu Cyril (production design), and Peter Hein (stunt choreography), and the soundtrack was composed by Harris Jayaraj, who was in his first collaboration with the director. The film was touted as the director's magnum opus and was budgeted at 263.8 million, making it at the time of its release the most expensive South Indian film ever made. Notably, it was the first South Indian film to obtain institutional finance, and it had the highest insurance coverage available for films at that time.

Originally filmed in Tamil, and released simultaneously in the 4 South Indian states on 10 June 2005, the film was dubbed into Telugu as Aparichithudu and Hindi as Aparichit The Stranger, was released a year later on 19 May 2006. Further, the film was also dubbed into French and released in French-speaking countries worldwide by Columbia Tristar. The film received positive reviews from critics and became a commercial success across South India. In addition to winning a record breaking eight Filmfare Awards and six State Film Awards, the film also won a National Award in the Special Effects category.

Plot 
Ramanujam Iyengar alias Ambi is a straightforward consumer protection advocate from Triplicane, Chennai. He expects everyone to follow the law and prosecutes those who violate it. However, his efforts fail as circumstantial evidences always seem to favour the accused. His efforts to raise civic awareness go in vain due to pervasive corruption and a general lack of seriousness. Frustrated at his inability to bring about a change in society, his suppressed anger manifests itself in an alter ego named Anniyan, a grim reaper-themed vigilante who murders corrupt and indifferent people. Anniyan creates a website, compiles a list of wrongdoers in it and kills them using punishments described in one of the ancient Hindu scriptures Garuda Puranam.

Ambi is secretly in love with his neighbour Nandini, a medical student and an aspiring Carnatic singer, but never expresses his feelings due to fear of rejection. When he does get the courage to do so during the annual Tyagaraja Aradhana with the help of his friend, Sub-inspector Chari, she rejects him as she cannot bear his overbearing nature and constant complaining and nitpicking. Distraught, Ambi attempts suicide, almost drowning himself before having second thoughts. Subsequently, he develops another personality named Remo, a metrosexual fashion model. Nandini is smitten by Remo and falls in love with him, unaware that Remo is one of Ambi's split personalities. Their marriage is eventually fixed.

While purchasing a plot of land for her dowry, Nandini decides to undervalue the property to evade stamp duty. Ambi, who accompanies her to the government office, refuses to help her on learning of her intention to skirt the law. Later, when Nandini and Remo are on a date, Remo transforms into Anniyan and attempts to punish her for her corrupt act. As he is about to kill her, Nandini calls out for Ambi. Anniyan then reverts to Ambi, who collapses and loses consciousness. Nandini takes Ambi to NIMHANS where he is diagnosed with MPD. Through RMT, Vijaykumar, the chief psychiatrist of NIMHANS, uncovers Ambi's past. It is revealed that when Ambi was ten years old, he witnessed the accidental death of his younger sister Vidya due to civic apathy.

The incident left a deep emotional scar, which is the reason for his lofty ideals. It is also discovered that while Anniyan and Remo are aware of Ambi as a separate person, Ambi is oblivious to their existence within him. Vijaykumar declares that Remo will cease to exist if Nandini reciprocates Ambi's feelings, but Anniyan will cease to exist only when the society reforms. Nandini accepts Ambi's love and Remo disappears.

Meanwhile, DCP Prabhakar and Chari investigate the murders committed by Anniyan. In disguises, they discover clues left behind by Anniyan, which are the names of the punishments he meted out to his victims. Prabhakar is personally determined to punish Anniyan, as one of his victims, Chockalingam, an errant catering contractor with the Indian Railways, was his elder brother. In a dramatic publicity stunt, Anniyan admits to the murders he committed when he appears amidst the public and the press at the Nehru Stadium. He explains the rationale behind them and says that only when every Indian is responsible and sincere will the country prosper on par with developed nations. His methods draw both praise and criticism. Prabhakar tries to catch Anniyan, but he escapes.

On investigating the phone records and IP address of Anniyan's internet activity, Prabhakar discovers that the connection belongs to Ambi. Upon further analysis of a security footage of Anniyan's public appearance, Ambi's face is revealed under the hood. Prabhakar arrests Ambi and subjects him to a polygraph test to make him confess to his crimes. The officers see that he is telling the truth and is oblivious to killing anyone, believing his innocence. Prabhakar, enraged and not having any of it, orders all the officers and Chari to leave, and begins brutally attacking and tormenting Ambi alone with Garuda Puranam punishments. Ambi is eventually thrown into a boiling hot salt water tank by Prabhakar.

When a traumatised Ambi begs for mercy, Prabhakar mockingly turns on the water cooler, making the water extremely cold to the point it becomes ice so that Ambi will freeze to death. The near-death experience and pain triggers Anniyan's reappearance. Ambi's personality alternates between Ambi and Anniyan; he brutally subdues Prabhakar as Anniyan, while begging for mercy as Ambi. Later, when Ambi is tried for several murders, Vijaykumar testifies to Ambi's mental condition. Chari also had secretly recorded Ambi's interrogation and torture at Prabhakar's hands and presents it as evidence of Ambi's mental condition. Ambi is acquitted, but is directed to undergo psychotherapy in a mental hospital and will be eligible for release when cured.

When Ambi is released two years later, his rigid adherence to protocol has diminished and he appears more open and accommodating. He marries Nandini. and while travelling on a train during their honeymoon, Ambi notices a man (an electrician who was indirectly responsible for his sister's death several years ago) drinking amidst fellow passengers. Moving himself and Nandini away from the man, he secretly transforms into Anniyan; makes his way back to the compartment and throws the man off the train, killing him. However, he hides the incident from Nandini, revealing that instead of Ambi eradicating his other personality, both have blended into one identity.

Cast 

 Vikram as Ramanujam "Ambi" Iyengar / Remo / Anniyan
 Sadha as Nandhini Krishnan, Ambi's love interest turned wife(voiceover by Kanika)
 Prakash Raj as DCP Prabhakar
 Vivek as Chari, Ambi's friend and Sub-Inspector
 Nedumudi Venu as Parthasarathy Iyengar, Ambi's father (voiceover by S. N. Surendar)
 Nassar as Vijaykumar, Ambi's psychiatrist
 Cochin Haneefa as a delinquent car owner
 Kalabhavan Mani as Ponnambalam, a covetous landlord
 Sairam Sukumaran as P. A. Bhirama
 Charle as a wastrel
 Shanmugarajan as Chockalingam, the railway contract caterer, DCP Prabhakar's brother
 Saurabh Shukla as Ethirajan Naidu, the brake cable company owner
 Yana Gupta as Club dancer (Item number in the song "Kaadhal Yaanai")

 Manobala as the Ticket Conductor on the train to Thiruvaiyaru
 Shanthi Williams as Susheela Iyengar, Ambi's mother
 Neelu as Ananthanarayanan, secretary of the Sangeetha Academy
 Sriranjini as Nandhini's mother (voice dubbed by Meera Krishnan)
 Vatsala Rajagopal as Ambi's grandma
 Mohan Vaidya as Krishnan, Nandhini's father
 Viraj as young Ambi
 Divya Nagesh as Vidya, Ambi's late sister
 Citizen Mani as a cook who works under Chockalingam
 P. Unnikrishnan Cameo Appearance as singer in Thyagaraja Festival
 Master Wong as Karate Master
 Stunt Silva as a passerby (Uncredited)

Production

Pre-production 
During the making of his Hindi film directorial debut Nayak starring Anil Kapoor in early 2001, director S. Shankar had conceived a science fiction film titled Robot. A futuristic techno-thriller set in the 22nd century Chennai, the film was to star Kamal Haasan and Preity Zinta. However, after completing a photo-shoot featuring the two, the production was shelved due to various reasons, including Haasan's unavailability of dates and creative differences with the director. Shankar postponed the project indefinitely and made the coming of age film, Boys (2003). When the post-production work of Boys was underway, Shankar was awaiting the return of its composer A. R. Rahman, who was then outside India, to complete the background score. In the meantime, Shankar had an idea for a storyline and called Vikram, who expressed enthusiasm for the subject.

Development 

Following the release of Boys in August 2003, Shankar began work on his next directorial venture entitled Anniyan. It was initially thought to be Shankar's pet project Robot revived with a new title, but this was later proven not to be correct. Shankar said the film was his "dream project" and disclosed that it would be a racy, fantasy-thriller. When questioned on how the idea behind the film had come to him, the director revealed, "The seeds of all my movies were sown when I was young, long before I started making movies. So many things disturbed me, and these stayed with me. Those were the seeds. I make films based on them."

With the highest production value among Tamil films of its time, the film was touted to be the director's magnum opus and was labelled "the most eagerly awaited film of the year" by the media. The film deals with a person having dissociative identity disorder, commonly known as "multiple personality disorder" (MPD) or "split personality syndrome". It was compared to Chandramukhi, released two months before, as it also focused on a character with the same syndrome.

Casting 
To portray the lead character, Shankar needed a performer who could play an action hero. He chose Vikram as he felt that the actor, in addition to being a performer, had the image of an action hero. While his casting was made public in a November 2003 news report announcing the project's inception, the director revealed that Vikram was added to the cast in mid-2003 and refuted theories that the actor's casting was to capitalise on his new-found popularity following his success at the National Film Awards, where he won the National Film Award for Best Actor for his performance in the film Pithamagan (2003). Stating that Vikram was selected for the lead role months before the theatrical release of Pithamagan, Shankar added, "I don't look at actors that way." He further remarked that Vikram was the "life and soul" of Anniyan.

The heroine role of a "devoted Iyengar Brahmin girl" was originally offered to Aishwarya Rai Bachchan, who was too busy to accommodate production dates. After months of waiting for her call sheet, Shankar eventually offered the role to Sadha. Expressing hope that it would be "an important movie" in her career, Sadha accepted the offer, working on the film for 120 days, adding, "I have a major role to play in Anniyan. There are few heavy portions involving me in the movie that I have given my best." She considered being a part of a Shankar film, especially during the early stages of her career, as a "god's gift" and a "once-in-a-lifetime experience". However, when offered similar roles following the film's success, she refused to be typecast and stated, "I am now looking for roles where my creative potential is tapped. I don't want to be part of such cinema where all one has to do is dance around trees."

Vivek, Prakash Raj, Nedumudi Venu and Nassar appear in supporting roles. Mohan Vaidhya, a carnatic vocalist and occasional actor, plays a minuscule role as Sadha's father Krishna. Malavika Avinash was approached to play Vikram's mother; she rejected the offer, stating, "I am too young to do a screen mom and too old to be a heroine!" Cochin Haneefa, Charle, Kalabhavan Mani, Shanmugarajan and Saurabh Shukla make cameo appearances as delinquent citizens. Haneefa played an indifferent car owner who refuses to help an accident victim as he does not want his "brand new car" to be soiled with blood. Following Haneefa's death in February 2010, Vikram recalled the actor's appearance in the film and said, "Though he'd come only in a few scenes no one could miss him. For roles that have some ambiguity about whether it's a good guy or a bad guy, he is one of the best choices. Until the end, one cannot really guess if he'll end up being good or bad." Comedian and character artiste Charle played an unnamed wastrel and alcoholic who extorts money from his ageing parents for his expenses and is considered by Anniyan to be a liability to society. Charle was instructed by Shankar, "People should see only the character. Only later should they realise that it was Charle."

The role of the younger Ambi was played by child actor Hari Prashanth alias Viraj. When he came to the recording studio to voice his lines, he was accompanied by his father S. N. Surendar, a singer and dubbing artiste. Shankar recognised Surendar and asked him to lend his voice for Nedumudi Venu as the latter was a Malayali. In the 2004 comedy film Aethirree, which featured Sadha in the female lead, Kanika played the second lead role of a "naughty" Brahmin girl. Shankar, apparently impressed with Kanika's performance in the film, asked her to attend a voice test. When the film-makers preferred Kanika's accent and modulation among the thirty females whose voices were tested, she was selected to dub for Sadha's Brahmin role.

Technical crew 
The film was produced by V. Ravichandran under his own film production and distribution company 'Oscar Films' (presently 'Aascar Films'). The screenplay was written by Shankar and the film had dialogue written by writer Sujatha. Shankar retained Sabu Cyril, his production designer from Boys, to handle the set design; the scenes were edited by V. T. Vijayan. While the action sequences were orchestrated by Peter Hein and assisted by Stunt Silva, the dance sequences were choreographed by Raju Sundaram, Kalyan and Ahmed Khan. Film institute student Prabhu Raja Chozhan, who would later turn director with Karuppampatti (2013), joined Shankar as his protégé and worked as his assistant.

Shankar, who grew up admiring the works of cinematographer P. C. Sreeram in films like Nayakan (1987), Agni Natchathiram (1988) and Idhayathai Thirudathe (1989), desired to collaborate and was in talks with him to handle the photography. While Sreeram was intent on working in Anniyan, he could not accept the offer due to prior commitments. It was initially reported in the media that Sreeram had been recruited; however, Shankar chose V. Manikandan as the director of photography, impressed with his work in Main Hoon Na (2004). Manikandan had earlier collaborated with Shankar when he shot the music video of the song "Secret of Success" in Boys. Manikandan gave six months of bulk dates for the project; but, when the production was troubled by delays, Shankar demanded three more months to complete the film. Manikandan walked out in October 2004 citing scheduling conflicts and Shankar replaced him with Ravi Varman.

During the casting stage of Boys, the film's cinematographer Ravi K. Chandran was temporarily unavailable and his then-assistant Ravi Varman handled the camera to film Genelia D'Souza's makeup test. Subsequently, Varman nurtured a desire to work with Shankar. Before Shankar commenced work on Anniyan, Varman expressed his desire to work in the film and was hopeful of landing the assignment. He was disappointed when Shankar recruited Manikandan for the project. However, when Manikandan abandoned the project after completing almost half the film, Shankar asked Varman to shoot the remaining portions of the film. Varman had committed to work in Bengali director Buddhadeb Dasgupta's next film, work on which was scheduled to begin shortly; he dropped out of it to accept Shankar's offer and termed working in Anniyan "a dream come true". The film credits both Manikandan and Ravi Varman as cinematographers in title credits.

Preparation and character looks 

Vikram allotted 18 months and 190 days of his call sheet for the film, including 165 days of bulk dates spread across six months. Speaking on the extent of his involvement in the filmmaking process, Vikram said, "Before beginning the film, I was totally involved in the research and preparation, but once on the sets, I go by what the director says." He further clarified that he discussed every shot with Shankar, went for re-takes where necessary to make the scenes better, and gave suggestions, but left the "ultimate verdict" to the director. Disclosing that, among the three shades to his character, he found playing Ambi to be the toughest, he reasoned, "Because as a hero you are not used to being a wimp on screen. It's difficult digesting getting beaten up." In contrast, being a graduate in English literature, he found playing Remo much easier and more in his comfort zone.

In an interview with Gulf News, Vikram spoke of the challenges in portraying all three characters while wearing the same costumes. He said, "I love such challenges. [...] Although the costume defined each of the three characters in Anniyan, there were scenes where Ambi would suddenly become Remo and Remo would become Anniyan. There I made it dramatic to bring out each character." He credited his wife Shailaja Balakrishnan, a psychologist, for helping him in fleshing out the character of Ambi, a person who has multiple personality disorder. In a conversation with film critic Baradwaj Rangan, Shailaja recalled the times the film was being made and spoke of Vikram, saying, "I felt we should live in two houses. It's not easy to live with a man who can get that eccentric, an actor who wants to be that difficult on himself. I wouldn't say he becomes the character, but there's definitely some kind of internalisation." Vikram confessed that he had a tough time during the film's making as playing different characters affected him and he found himself going mad. He added that he would take a break after a 15-day shoot and watch the pigeons on his terrace as a way of dealing with the pressure.

Vikram grew a tummy to portray Ramanujam while he sported a "macho look" for Anniyan. He also grew his hair long in preparation for his role and rejected other film offers to maintain the continuity in his looks. Together with his character looks and those that he sported in the song sequences, Vikram appears in the film in 18 different getups. Vikram's look in the film was created by make-up artiste Banu. For those parts that show him as metrosexual Remo, he coloured his hair in streaks of copper and blonde. Unwilling to reveal his 'new look' until the film was ready, Vikram avoided the media despite winning the aforementioned National Award for the year 2003. Meanwhile, Sadha's make-up and hair styling were done by Mumbai-based celebrity stylist Ojas M. Rajani.

Filming 
The film was officially launched with a traditional puja and muhurat shot on 4 March 2004 at AVM Studios, Chennai. The studio was decorated with life-sized stills showing Vikram in three distinct looks, "a voodoo hunter, a pious 'sami' and a bubbling youth"; this led the media to speculate that Vikram would be playing either a triple role or a character with three shades. The film's caption was 'He who comes from hell is not afraid of hot ashes'. During the launch function, Shankar expressed hope of completing the film in six months and releasing the film on 12 November 2004, coinciding with the Diwali festival. However, the production, which began shortly afterwards in May 2004, was marred by several delays and took 14 months to complete. The film was shot in Amsterdam, Malaysia, Mumbai, Hyderabad, Tenkasi, Thanjavur, Villupuram and Chennai.

The film stars a scene at the Thiruvaiyaru Thyagaraja Utsavam. The Utsavam is a week-long music festival which commemorates the 18th-century saint-composer Tyagaraja, revered as one of the greatest composers of carnatic music, and is held annually at his resting place in Thiruvaiyaru, Thanjavur. With the use of sets, the art department recreated the Tyagaraja Aradhana near Mahabalipuram in Tamil Nadu. For filming the scene, the crew recreated a performance of the famous kriti "Jagadānanda kārakā", the first of the five Pancharatna Kriti compositions of Tyagaraja, as performed during Tyagaraja Aradhana. The aradhana, held on the fifth day of the festival, witnesses exponents of carnatic music from across the world converging at his samaadhi, where they sing his pancharatna kritis in unison as an homage to the saint.

Shankar approached violin maestro Kunnakudi Vaidyanathan, a regular participant at the actual event, to conceive and orchestrate the sequence. Vaidyanathan was serving as the secretary of Sri Thyagabrahma Mahotsava Sabha, the committee which organises the aradhana. The scene features him in a cameo and was shot in June 2004 at a studio in Chennai. Realistic sets were erected to resemble the actual venue and leading carnatic vocalists Sudha Ragunathan, Sirkazhi G. Sivachidambaram, O. S. Arun, P. Unni Krishnan and instrumentalists such as violinist A. Kanyakumari, mridangam exponent Umayalpuram K. Sivaraman were recruited to add a touch of authenticity. The two-minute scene was brought to life in "painstaking detail". The sequence was much talked about and well appreciated.

In a fight sequence, Anniyan encounters about a hundred martial artists inside the fictional International Martial Arts School, Vodao. The stunt scene was shot at the JJ Indoor Stadium in Chennai over a period of 25 days. Peter Hein, the stunt choreographer, is a native of Vietnam. 127 professionally trained fighters were brought in from Vietnam for the shoot. During the rehearsals, the rope, to which the stuntmen were tied and hung upside down, gave in. About a dozen stuntmen crashed down from the balcony, injuring themselves badly. The action sequence was shot using 120 cameras for employing the time slice photography technique, a visual effect known as "bullet time" and popularised by the American film The Matrix (1999), to achieve the frozen-time effect. Shankar had earlier toyed with the idea of time-slice and tried it while filming the song "Ale Ale" in his Boys. While the time-freeze sequence in Boys was achieved by the linking of 60–62 cameras to attain a 180° rotation, Anniyan employed 120–122 cameras for a 270° rotation.

The scene where Anniyan addresses a huge gathering was shot in a stadium in Hyderabad. As he speaks to the audience, the lights turn on and off in the background. Speaking on how the sequence was filmed, Ravi Varman said that they decided not to light up the entire stadium as they felt it would have looked flat. As the sequence was important to the film, he juxtaposed the stadium with light and shadow so that it would look different. During the pre-climax scene, when Ambi is held custody and enquired by Prabhakar, Ambi's persona keeps switching between the characters Ambi and Anniyan. Dubbed the "chameleon act" in the media, Vikram claims to have completed the sequence in a single take.

An action sequence was filmed in a set erected in Campa Cola grounds, Chennai. For the scene where Remo courts Nandini, a chemical tube brought from Malaysia was used to measure how attractive a person is. For filming scenes based on the punishments, buffaloes and snakes were transported in hundreds exclusively from Vellore and the sequence was shot for about three days. The "Anthakoopam" punishment sequence featuring the buffaloes was filmed in a set erected in Chennai's Prasad Studios. The animals were transported in 15 lorries containing 20 buffaloes each. For the scene where Charle's character is killed by Anniyan, the studio was filled with snake charmers who were brought in to handle the large number of snakes.

Song sequences 
The semi-classical song "Kumari" was the first of the scenes to be shot. Filmed at the World Flower Show in May 2004, the sequence was picturised in a large tulip garden located in the city of Vijfhuizen near Amsterdam, Netherlands. The song was shot during the Netherlands International Flower Show called Floriade, a decennial event which was held between 10 April and 20 October 2004. While the crew had planned to film another song at a garden in Keukenhof, they were denied permission by the authorities as a previous Indian film crew had damaged the habitat a few weeks before.

The song features the lead pair singing amidst a flower farm as mridangam and flute players accompany them in the background. It was choreographed by Raju Sundaram who also appears in a cameo, playing a harmonium. As part of their roles, the male supporting actors who appear in the song were required to wear a panjakkacham and angavastram, leaving most of their body exposed to the freezing cold. The shoot began as early as 5:30 AM and the locals, who thought they should be out of their mind to be dressed so, came up to them and warned that they might freeze to death.

"Iyengaru Veetu", a semi-classical song, begins with a prelude of the Pancharatna Kriti "Jagadānanda kārakā". The actual song which follows later was picturised on a set erected at AVM Studios made to look like an old traditional Iyengar home in Thanjavur. The song was shot extravagantly with the lead pair and the dozens of support dancers sporting rich, colourful costumes.

In December 2004, a ten-day shoot was held in Mumbai for the item number "Kadhal Yaanai" featuring Vikram alongside a top model, whose identity was initially undisclosed to generate curiosity. It was later revealed to be Czech-based model Yana Gupta. Filmed by Ravi Varman and choreographed by Ahmed Khan, the song was filmed like a fashion show where Vikram and Yana Gupta wear fashionable clothes and sashay along a ramp. The song was filmed in a set erected in a studio to resemble a famous night-spot in London.

The track "Kannum Kannum Nokia", a peppy and trendy love duet choreographed by Raju Sundaram, was picturised on the lead pair and had them wearing costumes made entirely of designer labels. The song was picturised in Malaysia at the Kuala Lumpur International Airport and Petronas Towers. The song, filmed during the night, was reportedly the first song to be shot at the airport. Ravi Varman revealed in an interview that the song was shot like a commercial. The song was also filmed at the Nokia Headquarters in Espoo, Finland.

The folk song "Andangkaaka" was shot in a village near Sengottai. For filming the song, a huge set was erected to resemble a village. The sets were visualised and created by Sabu Cyril, the film's art director. Shankar adopted a village near Tenkasi and Sabu Cyril painted all the houses, roads, rocks and even a bridge in varied colours. They then hired hundreds of lorries and old model ambassador cars and painted faces on them. The faces of actors were painted on rock mountains. The lead pair were joined by hundreds of dancers and the total cost of the song worked out to 10 million. In all, 350 houses were painted.

Post-production 
In the narrative, Ambi is referred to the website, www.anniyan.com. Shankar envisioned that the website would take visitors through all the punishments that await sinners in hell. For designing the website, Shankar wanted to recreate hell and approached the Visual Computing Labs (VCL) of Tata Elxsi, a Mumbai-based company with which he had collaborated earlier for the song "Girlfriend" in Boys. The team at VCL conceptualised and created a 'hell' in 3d animation with the punishments taken from ancient scriptures. They also designed a grim reaper astride his bull who guides visitors through hell. Pankaj Khandpur, creative director of VCL said, "We tried to stay true to the scriptures, while creating imagery that wasn't too gory. [...] an interesting project since we had to visualise it all without any reference point." The animation was done in a span of three months.

VCL also did the CGI for a "cosmic zoom" scene, where the camera zooms from beyond the clouds to the streets of Chennai city, which no real camera can achieve. Aerial views and paintings of the city were stitched together along with computer generated images (CGI) of clouds to create the long, one-piece camera zoom. Animator and special effects designer L. I. Kannan, who would later turn director with the long-delayed period film Karikalan with Vikram in the lead, also worked on the special effects. Meanwhile, the special effects for the time-slice sequence were rendered by Big Freeze in London.

The scene where Anniyan addresses a packed audience in Nehru Stadium was filmed with the space empty. The crowd was created through visual effects using crowd multiplication methods. The VFX for the sequence was done under the supervision of visual effects consultant Zameer Hussain of Land Marvel Animation Studios, Chennai. The scene, in which hundreds of buffaloes chase down a delinquent car owner into an abandoned sand quarry and trample him to death, was accomplished through CGI using just one buffalo. The CG work, was supplied by Jayakumar and V. Srinivas Mohan of the Chennai-based firm, Indian Artists Computer Graphics. Srinivas and his team had earlier worked with Shankar in Boys. Speaking of the sequence, Srinivas quipped, "The animals are lethargic and listless in their movements. Nothing can make them agile."

Themes and influences 
The storyline in Anniyan is typical of Shankar's yen for showcasing society's ills and targets the inept, rules-flouting public. The film sheds light on the increasing social apathy and public negligence, and attempts to address these issues which plague the society and hamper the development of India. S. Anand of Outlook noted that most of Shankar's films portray the hero as a "one-man agent of change" and cited, "From the neo-Nazi character Kamal Haasan plays in Indian to his last film Anniyan, featuring a schizophrenic Brahmin serial killer who butchers 'wrongdoers', Shankar has always offered fascist-fantastic solutions to what he perceives as social ills resulting from typical governmental inertia."

In an interview with The Hindu, Shankar elaborated on the message he conveys through the film:

Following the release of the trailer on 7 May 2005, the film was believed to be inspired by the 1886 Robert Louis Stevenson novel, Strange Case of Dr Jekyll and Mr Hyde. Upon the film's release, The Hindu drew parallels between it and the 1998 novel Tell Me Your Dreams by Sidney Sheldon. Shankar denied that the film was inspired by Tell Me Your Dreams, claiming that he knew of the novel only after completing the script. Sify compared the character of Ambi to the protagonist of The Mask (1994), a film about a "mild mannered guy changing into a one-man army, craving to see natural justice realised".

The methods of punishment meted out to the sinners by Anniyan in the film is based on Garuda Purana, a Vaishnavite purana which speaks of life after death and punishments for wrongdoers. Shankar pointed out that he "worked tirelessly day and night and intense research was done with the help of a professor in department of Vaishnavism in Madras University."

Music 

The album marked Shankar's first collaboration with Harris Jayaraj; all his previous directorial ventures had A. R. Rahman composing the music. As Rahman was busy with his debut Broadway musical Bombay Dreams and had also signed up for another musical Lord of the Rings, Rahman and Shankar decided to part ways. In early 2004, Harris Jayaraj went on a trip to Phuket Islands in Thailand for some inspiration for the album; he was accompanied by Shankar and Vairamuthu. Eventually, the three songs penned by the lyricist were composed in the island. The visit took place much before the tragic 2004 tsunami struck the countries bordering the Indian Ocean and wreaked havoc. In a chat with Shankar, Harris Jayaraj said "the music was a challenge because the film was a mix of genres – action, comedy, thriller. In essence, it was a cock-mocktail .." Harris Jayaraj commenced the film's re-recording in April 2005 and took more than a month to complete, delaying the film's release. The soundtrack album features six tracks, including a theme music; the lyrics for the songs were written by Vairamuthu, Na. Muthukumar and Kabilan. The album was released as a soft launch on 13 May 2005.

== Release ==
The film cleared the censors without any cuts and was rated "U" (Universal) by the Central Board of Film Certification. While Shankar had hoped to release the film on Diwali 2004, there were numerous production delays which postponed the release date through early 2005. While production was completed in March 2005, the re-recording which began in April took more time than anticipated lasting nearly 45 days with Harris Jayaraj being blamed for further delays. After the film was postponed from 20 May 2005, and later, from 27 May 2005, the film was finally scheduled for 10 June 2005. But, Shankar released it a week later on 17 June 2005 as he considered 8 as his lucky number (1+7 yielding 8).

The film was dubbed into other South Indian languages and was released simultaneously in Tamil Nadu, Andhra Pradesh, Karnataka and Kerala. The film was also released in key overseas countries like the United States, the United Kingdom, Australia, Germany, Malaysia and Singapore. The film was released with 404 prints in Tamil and Telugu alone. Later, the film was dubbed into French by Paramount Pictures. Reportedly, Anniyan is the first Indian film to be dubbed into French and released in French-speaking countries worldwide by Columbia Tristar. The film was further dubbed and released in Hindi as Aparichit: The Stranger on 19 May 2006. It is the first film featuring Vikram in the lead to have a theatrical release in Hindi. At a private screening held a day before its Hindi theatrical release, the film received a "warm reception".

Reception 
Malathi Rangarajan of The Hindu said that the film works as it melds an interesting screen line with racy action. She also noted that the story resembled Shankar's Indian (1996) a lot while also bearing semblance to his Gentleman (1993). She remarked that the story and screenplay deserved to be lauded for its "ingenious sparks in narration" but problems arose with respect to its plausibility. She then declared, " [...] some of the best camera shots, stunts and locations on a mind-boggling scale have been showcased. If you enjoy magnificence in cinema you will like this Anniyan."

Krishnakumar wrote for Rediff.com that learning from the debacle of Boys, the director went back to his strength by taking a social theme, spicing it up and serving the perfect commercial fare. He added that in trying to explain multiple personality disorder in the simplest of terms, the director has only succeeded to a certain extent as a majority of viewers who are not that well informed might not even comprehend what is being said.

Visual Dasan of Kalki wrote that both the art director Sabu Cyril and composer Harris Jayaraj lent their hand to Shankar's grand visions, adding that everyone could bow down to Shankar's social responsibility of exaggerating colorful entertainment and sensitising the fan by watching Anniyan once while appreciating Vikram for his performance in three different characters and that Anniyan's transformation reminded him of Jim Carrey from The Mask. Dasan also appreciated Shankar for perfectly using other actors wherever necessary.

Labelling the film as a "must see", a reviewer at Sify acclaimed that the film holds the viewers riveted with its racy narration, a relevant message backed with technical wizardry, never-seen before colourful song picturisation and particularly the performance of Vikram. Yet, the reviewer criticised that the film was too lengthy and the story too thin on logic.

Reviewing Aparichithudu, the Telugu version of the film, The Hindu said that it was watchable. Regarding the Hindi version of the film, Raja Sen of Rediff.com derided the pathetic dubbing though saying that it was refreshing and watchable, despite boasting of enough masala to make the viewers sneeze. He concluded his review by saying, "Overall, Aparichit is a slickly made, well-paced actioner that works quite well, despite the dub. The film is engaging and crisply scripted, and the action is never too excessive, lightened by jokes and general tomfoolery that never offensively interrupts the actual plot."

Awards 
Following the commercial success of the Telugu version Aparichitudu, which was a runaway hit in Andhra Pradesh, Shankar was felicitated by Sri Venkateswara Social and Cultural Organisation (SVESCO) of Tirupati and was conferred the title 'Darsaka Brahma'. In a conversation with athlete Shiny Wilson, actor Jayaram remarked, "Anniyan was a runaway hit in Kerala. But if a Malayalam star had tried out an Anniyan-kind of role with a weird hairdo, it would have been a disaster!"

The film received numerous awards and nominations. The film won National Award in the Special Effects category. Anniyan became the fourth film directed by Shankar to receive that award; the other three are Kadhalan (1994), Indian (1996) and Jeans (1998). It also won eight out of the total 15 awards awarded by Filmfare for the best of Tamil cinema.

Economics

Pre-release 
By the time the production was nearing completion, the trade sources had estimated the film to cost around 120–150 million; but, as often happens with films directed by Shankar, the budget was overshot. Made at a cost of ₹263.8 million (worth ₹1,414.3 million in 2021 prices), Anniyan was touted as the most expensive South Indian film to be ever made during the time of its release.

IndiaGlitz estimates that the total production cost, excluding the remuneration cost of the cast and technicians, is 90 million. It was the first Tamil film and the first in South India to get institutional finance. For its institutional finance, it procured a sum of 95 million from IDBI Bank. Anniyan was insured by United India Insurance for 150 million, thereby making it the first south Indian film to be insured and also the largest insurance cover extended to a south Indian film at that time.

Distribution 
With the amount of hype the film generated in the media, theatre owners eagerly came forward and offered hefty prices as Minimum Guarantee (MG). In Tamil Nadu, funds amounting to 120 million were gathered as MG and advance. The MG raised through audio rights and movie distribution to theatres in Andhra Pradesh, Kerala, Karnataka and overseas fetched a combined sum of 224 million. The film was distributed and released throughout Tamil Nadu by Aascar Films.

The rights for Aparichithudu, the Telugu-dubbed version, was bought by a producer for an all-time record price. Meanwhile, the film was sold in Kerala for 13 million, which was again a record for a Tamil film there. The US rights was bought by the distribution house Bharat Creations. With the theatrical rights and pre-release booking, the trade circuit predicted that the film would recover its cost within ten days of its release.

Box office 
The advance booking for the film began on 14 June 2005 across Tamil Nadu and received overwhelming response from the audience which the trade circuit felt was "phenomenal". The film took a "historic opening" worldwide and set multiple records at the box office. A day after release, the film was touted as a hit. In its opening weekend (17–19 June), Anniyan grossed 5.024 million from only six multiplexes in Chennai and reached #1 position at the Chennai box-office. In Sathyam Cinemas alone, the film grossed 1.4 million, the highest ever three-day opening from a single multiplex in South India.

A week after release, the film grossed more than 10 million in Chennai, 2.7 million in Sathyam Cinemas, 7.1 million from 10 prints in Salem and netted 4.1 million in Coimbatore which were all box office records. And beyond Tamil Nadu, the film earned the distributors 12.7 million from Nizam in Andhra, 5 million in Karnataka and 1 million from 3 screens in Mumbai. The film got a hundred percent opening and surpassed Chandramukhi as the top-grossing Tamil film of the week, a position occupied by the latter since its release on 14 April 2005. IndiaGlitz likened the Vikram-Shankar combo to that of Sachin Tendulkar and Brian Lara batting together. The trade pundits estimated that V. Ravichandran would get a distributor's share of 80–100 million in its first week from cinemas across Tamil Nadu. A week after its release, the Telugu-dubbed version Aparichithudu was declared a hit in Andhra Pradesh. Distributor Karunakara Reddy of Megha Films in Hyderabad quipped, "Aparichitudu has taken an opening just like a Telugu superstar film and should collect a distributor's share of Rs. 5–7 crores for the Nizam area alone." In Kerala, Anniyan released in 35 screens across the state, receiving a "record opening" for a Tamil film and became the first Tamil film to get a distributors' share of 6.2 million in its first week. A fortnight after its release, the film was labelled a "super hit" in Tamil cinema's half-yearly report compiled by film trade analyst for The Hindu Sreedhar Pillai.

In exactly a six-week theatrical run, Anniyan netted 10.5 million with a distributor's share of around 5.2 million. It was an "all India record for collections, the highest share in least number of days from any theatre in India." However, in Tamil Nadu, collections began dropping five weeks after its release and it was estimated that the film would earn a share of  160 million. In September 2005, the film's gross earnings surpassed the 2 million milestone. At the completion of a 50-day run at Sathyam Cinemas, Anniyan "recorded the highest 50 days collection for a Tamil film from a single screen in the world" earning 11.29 million.

Anniyan was declared a blockbuster at the close of the year and, together with Chandramukhi, earned an estimated gross of 1.1 billion worldwide. The film also collected a distributor's share of 20 million. In Andhra Pradesh, Aparichitudu was named the biggest hit of 2005. The film did better business than straight Telugu films. It was the highest grosser among all Telugu films released that year. The film's success earned Vikram a big fan-following in Andhra. It also prompted producers in the Telugu film industry, which had hit a rough patch following a spate of box-office failures, to acquire the dubbing rights to Vikram's previous Tamil films and release them in Telugu.

In Kerala, the film ran for more than 150 days and grossed over 60 million, it became the highest grossing Tamil film in Kerala at that time. In Karnataka too, the film was a "big success" although the exact box-office figures are not known. However, the film's Hindi version Aparichit opened to poor reception earning only 21 million across 150 screens and was declared a flop by Box Office India. While acknowledging that the film underperformed at the box-office, Vikram stated that it nevertheless made an impact. He further added that the film got him recognition from people in the remote corners of India as the drama and the action sequences greatly appealed to them. By the end of its theatrical run, the film had grossed 570 million in its lifetime.

Legacy 
In an August 2005 seminar titled "Revisiting psychiatric disorders in Tamil films", where the discussion revolved around the films Chandramukhi and Anniyan, psychiatrist Asokan found many logical faults in both films. While acknowledging that Anniyan was a technically better film, he stated that it did not explain some of the medical theories. In another August 2005 seminar conducted to mark the anniversary of the Quit India Movement, where participants were urged to actively fight corruption, the convener T. Hema Kumari referred to the films Bhaarateeyudu (the Telugu dubbed version of Indian) and Aparichitudu. She noted that while such films which depict a fight against corruption were appreciated, people were reluctant to join movements against such issues.

Remake plans 
Despite the dubbed Hindi version, in April 2021, it was announced that Shankar would direct a Hindi remake with Ranveer Singh reprising Vikram's role. However, in August 2021, it was reported that the remake is stalled due to the differences with producer V. Ravichandran. Ravichandran alleged that the film was getting a remake without his consent and he challenged it.

Impact 
During the 20th Vijayawada Book Festival held at Vijayawada in January 2009, Garuda Puranam, one of the 18 puranas of Hinduism, was a best-seller. Writing for The Hindu, G.V. Ramana Rao said that the book was made popular following several mentions in the film and sold like "hot cakes". Following the stupendous success of Aparichitudu in Andhra Pradesh, the State Transport Corporation of Warangal named a bus Remo, after the character played by Vikram in the film. When stand-up comedian and television anchor Bosskey launched a quirky play titled Dada (Don) in October 2005, he named the cast after famous characters in Tamil films. Accordingly, Anniyan (one of Vikram's character in the film), Badshah (Rajinikanth in Baashha) and Velu Nayakkar (Kamal Haasan's role in Nayakan) play the central characters of a family of brothers. Similarly, in the 2013 comedy film Onbadhule Guru, in which the characters were named after popular protagonists of Tamil cinema, a member of the supporting cast was christened Anniyan.

The characters played by Vikram were spoofed by Vadivelu in the Tamil film Aaru (2005); the comedy sequence also features four songs from the film's soundtrack album. Aparichitudu, the film's Telugu version, was parodied by comedian Venu Madhav in the Telugu films Chatrapati (2005) and Seenugadu Chiranjeevi Fan (2005). It was also parodied, along with Chandramukhi, in the film Rajababu (2006). In the 2010 film Thamizh Padam, a full-length parody on stereotypical characters and clichéd sequences in Tamil cinema, the lead actor Shiva recreates the "Anthakoopam" punishment sequence to comic effect, where he tries to force a herd of buffaloes into stampeding a villain but fails in his attempt. Later, the comedy sequence was re-enacted by Allari Naresh in Sudigadu (2012), an official remake of Thamizh Padam. In the 2012 Kannada film Yaare Koogadali, a remake of the Tamil film Poraali (2011), the long and unkempt hair sported by Puneeth Rajkumar was reportedly inspired by the look of Anniyan. The character Remo inspired Sivakarthikeyan's film to have a title of the same name.

See also 
 Mental disorders in fiction
 List of mental disorders in film
 Dissociative identity disorder
 Corruption in India

Notes

References

Bibliography

External links 
 
 
 
 

2000s Tamil-language films
2000s vigilante films
2005 action thriller films
2005 films
2005 psychological thriller films
Films about dissociative identity disorder
Films about corruption in India
Films directed by S. Shankar
Films set in Chennai
Films shot in Amsterdam
Films shot in Finland
Films shot in Hyderabad, India
Films shot in Kollam
Films shot in Malaysia
Films shot in Mumbai
Films shot in Tirunelveli
Films that won the Best Special Effects National Film Award
Indian action thriller films
Tamil-language psychological thriller films
Indian vigilante films
Films scored by Harris Jayaraj